Rosi Braidotti (born 28 September 1954) is a contemporary philosopher and feminist theoretician. Born in Italy, she studied in Australia and France and works in the Netherlands.

Biography

Career
Braidotti, who holds Italian and Australian citizenship, was born in Italy and moved to Australia when she was 16, where she received degrees from the Australian National University in Canberra in 1977 and was awarded the University Medal in Philosophy and the University Tillyard prize.  Braidotti then moved on to do her doctoral work at the Sorbonne, where she received her degree in philosophy in 1981.  She has taught at the University of Utrecht in the Netherlands since 1988, when she was appointed as the founding professor in women's studies. In 1995 she became the founding Director of the Netherlands research school of Women's Studies, a position she held till 2005.

Braidotti is a pioneer in European Women's Studies: she founded the inter-university SOCRATES network NOISE and the Thematic Network for Women's Studies ATHENA, which she directed till 2005. She was a Leverhulme Trust Visiting Professor at Birkbeck College in 2005–6; a Jean Monnet professor at the European University Institute in Florence in 2002-3 and a fellow in the school of Social Science at the Institute for Advanced Study in Princeton in 1994. She is a founding member of the European Consortium for Humanities Institutes and Centres (ECHIC), 2008; in 2010 she was elected member of the Board of the Consortium Humanities Centres and Institutes (CHCI) and in 2014 a member of the Scientific Council of the Conseil National de la Recherche Scientifique in France. Braidotti was the founding Director of the Centre for the Humanities at Utrecht University (2007-2016), and is currently Distinguished University Professor at Utrecht University.

Braidotti serves, or has served, on the advisory board of many academic feminist journals, including differences, Signs, Women's Studies International Forum, and Feminist Formations.

Four publications on subjectivity
Braidotti's publications have consistently been placed in continental philosophy, at the intersection with social and political theory, cultural politics, gender, feminist theory and ethnicity studies. The core of her interdisciplinary work consists of four interconnected monographs on the constitution of contemporary subjectivity, with special emphasis on the concept of difference within the history of European philosophy and political theory. Braidotti's philosophical project investigates how to think difference positively, which means moving beyond the dialectics that both opposes it and thus links it by negation to the notion of sameness.

This is evidenced in the philosophical agenda set in her first book Patterns of Dissonance: An Essay on Women in Contemporary French Philosophy, 1991, which gets developed further in the trilogy that follows. In the next book, Nomadic Subjects: Embodiment and Difference in Contemporary Feminist Theory, 1994, the question is formulated in more concrete terms: can gender, ethnic, cultural or European differences be understood outside the straitjacket of hierarchy and binary opposition? Thus the following volume, Metamorphoses: Towards a Materialist Theory of Becoming, 2002, analyses not only gender differences, but also more categorical binary distinctions between self and other, European and foreign, human and non-human (animal/ environmental/ technological others).

The conclusion is that a systematic ambivalence structures contemporary cultural representations of the globalised, technologically mediated, ethnically mixed, gender-aware world we now inhabit. The question consequently arises of what it takes to produce adequate cultural and political representations of a fast-changing world and move closer to Spinozian notions of adequate understanding.

The ethical dimension of Braidotti's work on difference comes to the fore in the last volume of the trilogy, Transpositions: On Nomadic Ethics, 2006. Here she surveys the different ethical approaches that can be produced by taking difference and diversity as the main point of reference and conclude that there is much to be gained by suspending belief that political participation, moral empathy and social cohesion can only be produced on the basis of the notion of recognition of sameness.

Braidotti makes a case for an alternative view on subjectivity, ethics and emancipation and pitches diversity against the postmodernist risk of cultural relativism while also standing against the tenets of liberal individualism. Throughout her work, Braidotti asserts and demonstrates the importance of combining theoretical concerns with a serious commitment to producing socially and politically relevant scholarship that contributes to making a difference in the world. Braidotti's output also included several edited volumes. Her work has been translated in a total of 19 languages and all the main books in at least three languages other than English.

Latest publications
In The Posthuman (Polity Press, 2013), Braidotti offers both an introduction and major contribution to contemporary debates on the posthuman. As the traditional distinction between the human and its others has blurred, exposing the non-naturalistic structure of the human, The Posthuman starts by exploring the extent to which a post-humanist move displaces the traditional humanistic unity of the subject. Rather than perceiving this situation as a loss of cognitive and moral self-mastery, Braidotti argues that the posthuman helps us make sense of our flexible and multiple identities.

Braidotti then analyzes the escalating effects of post-anthropocentric thought, which encompass not only other species, but also the sustainability of our planet as a whole. Because contemporary market economies profit from the control and commodification of all that lives, they result in hybridization, erasing categorical distinctions between the human and other species, seeds, plants, animals and bacteria. These dislocations induced by globalized cultures and economies enable a critique of anthropocentrism, but how reliable are they as indicators of a sustainable future?

The Posthuman concludes by considering the implications of these shifts for the institutional practice of the humanities. Braidotti outlines new forms of cosmopolitan neo-humanism that emerge from the spectrum of post-colonial and race studies, as well as gender analysis and environmentalism. The challenge of the posthuman condition consists in seizing the opportunities for new social bonding and community building, while pursuing sustainability and empowerment.

In 2011 Braidotti published two new books: the renewed and revised edition of Nomadic Subjects and collection of essays Nomadic Theory. The Portable Rosi Braidotti. The collection provides a core introduction to Braidotti's nomadic theory and its innovative formulations, which engage with Gilles Deleuze, Michel Foucault, Luce Irigaray, and a host of political and cultural issues. Arranged thematically, essays begin with such concepts as sexual difference and embodied subjectivity and follow with explorations in technoscience, feminism, postsecular citizenship, and the politics of affirmation.

Influenced by philosophers such as Gilles Deleuze and especially French feminist thinker Luce Irigaray, Braidotti has brought postmodern feminism into the Information Age with her considerations of cyberspace, prosthesis, and the materiality of difference.  Braidotti also considers how ideas of gender difference can affect our sense of the human/animal and human/machine divides. Braidotti has also pioneered European perspectives in feminist philosophy and practice and has been influential on [third-wave as well as post-secular feminisms].

In 2022, Braidotti published Posthuman Feminism, a text that helps establish a theoretical foundation for posthuman feminism, an alternate strand of posthumanism that seeks to move beyond Enlightenment humanism, embrace the nonhuman, and imagine how technology is changing our lives while still centering social justice issues of gender, race, and class.

Honours
On 3 March 2005, Braidotti was honored with a Royal Knighthood from Queen Beatrix of the Netherlands; in August 2006 she received the University Medal from the University of Łódź in Poland and she was awarded an Honorary Degree in Philosophy from Helsinki University in May 2007. In 2009, she was elected Honorary Fellow of the Australian Academy of the Humanities. Since 2009 she is a board member of Consortium of Humanities Centre and Institutes. In 2013 she received an Honorary Degree in Philosophy from Linköping University in Sweden. Braidotti was elected a member of Academia Europaea in 2014.

International activities (2011–present)
 2017: Delivered the Tanner Lectures on Human Values at the Whitney Humanities Center, Yale University (1-3 March 2017).
 2015–present: Appointed member of the core group of the steering committee for the First World Humanities Conference, organized by CIPSH (Conseil International de la Philosophie et des Sciences Humaines), UNESCO and the University of Liège (Belgium), 6–12 August 2017. Presidents of the Conference: Prof. Chao Gejin (Beijing) and Prof. Robert Halleux (University of Liège).
 2014: Elected member of the Scientific Council of the Conseil National de la Recherche Scientifique in France.   
 2012: Mellon Foundation Grant for an international collaborative project on: 'Religion and Political Belonging', with the University of Portland, Oregon; the University of Arizona, of Tel Aviv, The Chinese University of Hong Kong and Duke University in the USA.
 2011 – present: Founding member of the European Consortium for Humanities Institutes and Centres ECHIC.

Bibliography

Books

 1991, Patterns of Dissonance: an Essay on Women in Contemporary French Philosophy,: Cambridge: Polity Press; USA: Routledge, pp. 316. Second edition: 1996.
 1994, Co-authored with Ewa Charkiewicz, Sabine Hausler and Saskia Wieringa: Women, the Environment and Sustainable Development. Towards a Theoretical Synthesis, London: Zed Books, pp. 220.
 1994, Nomadic Subjects. Embodiment and Sexual difference in Contemporary Feminist Theory. Cambridge: Columbia University Press, pp. 326.
 1996, Madri, Mostri e Macchine, Rome: Manifesto Libri, With postface by Anna Maria Crispino. Second edition, revised and enlarged, 2005.
 2002, Nuovi soggetti nomadi, Roma: Luca Sossella editore, pp. 201.
 2002, Metamorphoses: Towards a Materialist Theory of Becoming, Cambridge: Polity Press, pp. 317.
 2003, Baby Boomers: Vite parallele dagli anni Cinquanta ai cinquant’anni, Florence: Giunti, pp. 191.
 2004, Feminismo, diferencia sexual y subjetividad nomade, Barcelona: Gedisa, pp. 234.
 2004, Op doorreis: nomadisch denken in de 21ste eeuw, Amsterdam: Boom, pp. 298.
 2006, Transpositions: On Nomadic Ethics, Cambridge: Polity Press pp. 304.
 2007, Egy nomád térképei. Feminizmus a posztmodern után, Budapest: Balassi Kiado, pp. 137.
 2009, La philosophie, là où on ne l’attend pas, Paris: Larousse, pp. 286.
 2011a, Nomadic Subjects. Embodiment and Sexual Difference in Contemporary Feminist Theory, Second Edition, New York: Columbia University Press, pp. 334.
 2011b, Nomadic Theory. The Portable Rosi Braidotti, New York: Columbia University Press, pp. 416.
 2013, The Posthuman. Cambridge, Polity Press.
 2017, Per Una Politica Affermativa. Milano: Mimesis/I Volti.
 2017, Posthuman Knowledge. Cambridge, Polity Press.
 2021, Posthuman Feminism. Cambridge, Polity Press.

Edited Volumes 
 Guest editor 
 Guest editor 
 Een beeld van een vrouw. De visualisering van het vrouwelijke in een postmoderne cultuur, Kampen: Kok Agora, 1993, pp. 188.
 Poste restante. Feministische berichten aan het postmoderne. Kampen: Kok Agora, 1994, pp. 157.
 (Ed. with Suzette Haaksma), Ik denk dus zij is; De vrouwelijke intellectueel in literair en historisch perspectief, Kampen: Kok Agora, 1994, pp. 199.
 (Ed. with Nina Lykke) Between Monsters, Goddesses and Cyborgs. Feminist Confrontations With Science, Medicine and Cyberspace.London: Zed Books, 1996, pp. 260.
 (Ed. with Gloria Wekker) Praten in het donker. Multiculturalisme en anti-racisme in feministisch perspectief. Kampen: Kok Agora, 1996, pp. 170.
 (Ed. with Gabriele Griffin) Thinking Differently: a Reader in European Women's Studies, London / New York: Zed Books, 2002, pp. 405.
 (Ed. with Charles Esche and Maria Hlavajova) Citizens and Subjects: The Netherlands, for example, Critical Reader/Catalogue for the Dutch Pavilion at the Biennale in Venice, 2007 Utrecht: BAK and Zurich: JRP, pp. 334.
 (Ed. with Claire Colebrook and Patrick Hanafin) Deleuze and Law. Forensic Futures, London: Palgrave Macmillan, 2009, pp. 212.
 (Ed. with Claire Colebrook) special edition of Australian Feminist Studies, on: "Feminist Timelines', Routledge Volume 24 Issue 59, 2009, pp. 142.
 The History of Continental Philosophy Volume 7, Durham: Acumen, 2010, pp. 398.
 (Ed. with Patrick Hanafin and Bolette Blaagaard) After Cosmopolitanism, New York: Routledge, 2012, pp. 188.
 (Ed. with Patricia Pisters) Revisiting Normativity with Deleuze, [London and New York: Continuum], 2012, pp. 238.
 (Ed. with Rick Dolphijn) This Deleuzian Century, Leiden: Brill, 2015.
 (Ed. with Paul Gilroy) Conflicting Humanities, London: Bloomsbury, 2016.
 (Ed. with Rick Dolphijn) Philosophy After Nature, London and New York: Rowman & Littlefield, 2017.
 (Ed. with Maria Hlavajova) The Posthuman Glossary, London: Bloomsbury Publishing, 2017.

Translations

The Posthuman
 Turkish translation: Insan Sonrasi, Istanbul: Kolektif, 2014, pp. 240.
 German translation: Posthumanismus: Leben jenseits des Menschen, Frankfurt/New York: Campus, 2014, pp. 215. 
 Italian translation: Il postumano. La vita oltre il sé, oltre la specie, oltre la morte, Rome: Derive Approdi, 2014, pp. 256..
 Polish translation: Po człowieku, Warszawa: Wydawnictwo Naukowe PWN SA, 2014, pp. 380.
 Korean Translation: 포스트 휴먼. Seoul: Acanet, 2015.
 Chinese translation: 后人类，trans.  Gencheng Song, Henan Publishing House, 2016.6
 Romanian translation: Braidotti, Rosi. (2016). Postumanul. Trad. Ovidiu Anemțoaicei. București: Hecate.

Transpositions
Italian translation: Trasposizioni. Sull’etica nomade, Roma: Luca Sosella Editore, 2008, pp. 343.
Spanish translation: Transposiciones, Barcelona: Gedisa, 2009, pp. 414.

Metamorphoses
 Italian translation: In Metamorfosi, Milano: Feltrinelli, 2003.
 Spanish translation: Metamorfosis. Hacia una teoria materialista del devenir, Madrid: Akal Ediciones, 2005
 Korean translation: Moonhwa Kwahak Sa., 2011

Nomadic subjects
Greek translation: Νομαδικά Yποκείμενα: Ενσωματότητα και έμφυλη διαφορά στη σύγχρονη φεμινιστική θεωρία, Athens: Nissos, 2014.
Italian translation: Soggetto Nomade, Rome: Donzelli, 1995.
Spanish translation: Sujetos Nómades Corporización y Diferencia Sexual en la Teoria Feminista Contemporánea, Buenos Aires, Barcelona, Mexico: Paidos, 2000.
Translation into Russian of some extracts of Nomadic Subjects: Embodiment and Sexual Difference in Contemporary Feminist Theory. In particular: "Introduction: By Way of Nomadism" (pp. 13–22) and chapter 11: 'Women's Studies and the politics of Difference'(pp. 136–163). In: Sergei Zherebkin (ed.) Anthology on Western Gender Studies Theory, II Volume of the textbook Introduction to Gender Studies, St. Petersburg: Aleteia and Kharcov Center for Gender Studies, 2001. Translated by Zaven Babloyan.
Portuguese translation of chapter 8: "A diferença sexual como um projecto politico nomada" in: Genero, Identitade e Desejo. Antologia Critica do Femminismo Contemporaneo, Lisboa: Ediçoes Cotovia, 2002.
Korean translation, 2005.
Russian translation of chapter 8: "Sexual Difference as a Nomadic Political Project" in: Feminism, Art and Theory. 1970–2000, Moscow: RosPen, 2005.
Polish translation: Podmioty Nomadyczne. Ucieleśnienie I różnica seksualna w feminizmie współczesnym, Warszawa: Wydawnictwa Naukowe I Profesjonalne, 2009.

Patterns of Dissonance
 Dutch translation: Beelden van de leegte. Kampen: Kok Agora, 1991; Amsterdam: Rainbow paperback edition, 1995.
 Finnish translation: Riitasointuja. Tampere: Vastapaino, 1993.
 Italian translation: Dissonanze. Le donne e la filosofia contemporanea. Milano: La Tartaruga, 1994.

Performances

 2015, Music, Drugs and Emancipation: On Bach’s Coffee Cantate – Eventalk Series, Early Music Festival, Utrecht. 
 2014, Punk Women and Riot Grrls – First Supper Symposium, Oslo, Norway.

References

External links
  Rosi Braidotti personal page
 Catherine S. Stimpson on Rosi Braidotti's work in LA Review of Books.

1954 births
Living people
Postmodern feminists
Italian feminists
Lesbian academics
Australian National University alumni
Feminist theorists
Australian feminist writers
People from Latisana
Academic staff of Utrecht University
Neo-Spinozism
Spinozists
Members of Academia Europaea
Italian emigrants to Australia